Carallia is a genus of trees in the family Rhizophoraceae.

Description
Carallia species grow as small to medium-sized trees. Their leaves are often dotted black. The fruits are small and  ellipsoid to roundish in shape.

Distribution and habitat
Carallia species grow naturally in Madagascar, tropical Asia and northern Australia. Their habitat is lowland rainforests, swamps and on hills from sea level to about  altitude.

Selected species
 Carallia borneensis 
 Carallia brachiata  - corkwood (butterfly plant)
 Carallia calycina 
 Carallia coriifolia 
 Carallia diplopetala 
 Carallia euryoides

References

 
Malpighiales genera
Taxonomy articles created by Polbot